USS Charlie B. Mason (SP-1225), frequently but apparently incorrectly referred to as Charles B. Mason, was a United States Navy patrol vessel in commission from 1917 to 1918.

Charlie B. Mason was a motorboat built in 1900 at Hopkins, Virginia, probably for use as a commercial fishing boat. On 1 June 1917, the U.S. Navy chartered her from her owner, John K. Colona of Chincoteague, Virginia, for use as a section patrol boat during World War I. She was commissioned the same day as USS Charlie B. Mason (SP-1225).

Assigned to the 5th Naval District, Charlie B. Mason operated on patrol duty for the rest of World War I. She was decommissioned on 21 December 1918 and returned to Colona the same day.

Notes

References
  as "Charles B. Mason"
 Department of the Navy: Navy History and Heritage Command: Online Library of Selected Images: U.S. Navy Ships: USS Charlie B. Mason (SP-1225), 1917-1918. Name also cited as Charles B. Mason
 NavSource Online: Section Patrol Craft Photo Archive: Charles B. Mason (SP 1225)

Patrol vessels of the United States Navy
World War I patrol vessels of the United States
Ships built in Hopkins, Virginia
1900 ships